East Nassau is a village in Rensselaer County, New York, United States. The population was 587 at the 2010 census.

The Village of East Nassau is in the eastern section of the town of Nassau along the Town of Stephentown border by Routes 20 and 66.

History 
The community was first known as "Schermerhorn's" after an early inhabitant. East Nassau incorporated as a village in 1998.

The East Nassau Central School was listed on the National Register of Historic Places in 1997.

Geography
East Nassau is located at  (42.528830, -73.515997).

Demographics

As of the census of 2000, there were 571 people, 216 households, and 150 families residing in the village. The population density was 116.6 people per square mile (45.0/km2). There were 255 housing units at an average density of 52.1 per square mile (20.1/km2). The racial makeup of the village was 96.32% White, 0.88% African American, 1.58% Asian, 0.18% from other races, and 1.05% from two or more races. Hispanic or Latino of any race were 0.88% of the population.

There were 216 households, out of which 32.9% had children under the age of 18 living with them, 60.2% were married couples living together, 5.6% had a female householder with no husband present, and 30.1% were non-families. 23.6% of all households were made up of individuals, and 9.3% had someone living alone who was 65 years of age or older. The average household size was 2.64 and the average family size was 3.18.

In the village, the population was spread out, with 28.4% under the age of 18, 4.0% from 18 to 24, 30.1% from 25 to 44, 22.1% from 45 to 64, and 15.4% who were 65 years of age or older. The median age was 38 years. For every 100 females, there were 100.4 males. For every 100 females age 18 and over, there were 96.6 males.

The median income for a household in the village was $42,250, and the median income for a family was $48,125. Males had a median income of $35,750 versus $30,893 for females. The per capita income for the village was $24,740. About 2.7% of families and 7.9% of the population were below the poverty line, including 9.4% of those under age 18 and 6.0% of those age 65 or over.

Government
The village is governed by a Mayor-Council form of government. The mayor is elected every two years during even number years. Village trustees are elected for two year terms that overlap.

The current Mayor is Adam Acquario. Village trustees are Jeff Root, Lydia Davis, Thomas Kernan, and Nick Atchinson (2022).

References

Further reading

External links

 Village of East Nassau homepage

Villages in New York (state)
Villages in Rensselaer County, New York